The Senator George Sellar Bridge at Wenatchee, Washington was built in 1950 as the "Columbia River Bridge" to carry U.S. Route 2 across the Columbia River.

The bridge's engineer was R. W. Finke. The contractor was the General Construction Company of Seattle, using steel fabricated by the American Bridge Company. The bridge rests on two concrete piers in the river, with the central arch between them, and cantilever spans extending to concrete abutments high on the riverbanks. 

The bridge was renamed in 2000 after George L. Sellar, a Washington state senator who died that year. Since then, the name  "Columbia River Bridge" refers to the older bridge (built in 1908) nearby. Senator George Sellar Bridge carries Washington State Route 285 since the construction of the Richard Odabashian Bridge for Route 2 farther north. An additional lane was added in 2009–2010. The bridge was placed on the National Register of Historic Places on May 24, 1995.

See also
 
 
 
 List of crossings of the Columbia River

References

Road bridges on the National Register of Historic Places in Washington (state)
Through arch bridges in the United States
Bridges completed in 1950
Bridges in Chelan County, Washington
Bridges in Douglas County, Washington
Bridges over the Columbia River
U.S. Route 2
Bridges of the United States Numbered Highway System
National Register of Historic Places in Chelan County, Washington
National Register of Historic Places in Douglas County, Washington
1950 establishments in Washington (state)
Steel bridges in the United States